The Sweet Keeper is the second studio album by British pop/folk singer-songwriter Tanita Tikaram, released in 1990. Like her debut album Ancient Heart (1988), it was produced by Peter Van Hooke and Rod Argent. Three tracks from the album were released as singles: "We Almost Got It Together", "Little Sister Leaving Town" and "Thursday's Child".

Critical reception

On its release, Bob Stanley of Melody Maker felt Tikaram's voice was the "centrepiece" of the album. He praised the use of strings and brass as "an inspired move", but felt they "intrude" on some of the songs. He considered Tikaram's lyrics to "barely compare" to those of her inspirations, Leonard Cohen and Joni Mitchell, stating that they "sound portentous, but are ultimately shadows to the words of Tanita's heroes and heroines". Stanley concluded, "The Sweet Keeper sees Tanita dabbling with the folk-pop of her debut, embellishing and improving it in some areas. They'll love it in Basingstoke and Norway - the next LP will be the real test."

Track listing 
All tracks composed by Tanita Tikaram.
"Once & Not Speak"
"Thursday's Child"
"It All Came Back Today"
"We Almost Got It Together"
"Consider the Rain"
"Sunset's Arrived"
"Little Sister Leaving Town"
"I Owe All to You"
"Love Story"
"Harm in Your Hands"

Personnel

Tanita Tikaram – guitar, vocals
Mark Isham – trumpet
Rod Argent – arranger, conductor, keyboards
Sonny Landreth – bottleneck guitar
Abigail Brown – violin
Richie Buckley – tenor saxophone
David Clifton – guitar
Mark Cresswell – guitar
Mitch Dalton – acoustic guitar
Mark Davies – cello
Roger Garland – violin
John Giblin – bass
Roy Gillard – violin
John Heley – cello
Helen Kamminga – viola
Martin O'Connor – accordion
Helen O'Hara – violin, arranger
Mark  – violin
Peter Van Hooke – arranger, drums
Clem Clempson – acoustic guitar
Rory McFarlane – bass
Katherine Shave – violin
Robert Woollard – cello
Andrew Davis – double bass
Anne Solomon – violin

Charts

Certifications and sales

References 

1990 albums
Tanita Tikaram albums
Albums produced by Rod Argent
Albums produced by Peter Van Hooke
East West Records albums